The following highways are numbered 134:

Australia 
 Anglesea Road

Canada 
  New Brunswick Route 134
  Ontario Highway 134 (former)
  Prince Edward Island Route 134
  Quebec Route 134

Costa Rica
 National Route 134

India 
  National Highway 134 (India)
  State Highway 134 (Maharashtra)
  State Highway 134 (Tamil Nadu)

Japan 
  Japan National Route 134

Mexico 
  Mexican Federal Highway 134
  Mexican Federal Highway 134D

United Kingdom 
  A134 road, England

United States 
  Alabama State Route 134
  Arkansas Highway 134
  California State Route 134
  Colorado State Highway 134
  Florida State Road 134
  County Road 134 (Levy County, Florida)
  Georgia State Route 134 (former)
  Hawaii Route 134
  Illinois Route 134
  Indiana State Road 134
  Iowa Highway 134 (1935-1980) (former)
  K-134 (Kansas highway) (former)
  Kentucky Route 134
  Louisiana Highway 134
  Maine State Route 134
  Maryland Route 134
  Massachusetts Route 134
  M-134 (Michigan highway)
  Missouri Route 134
  Nebraska Highway 134 (former)
  County Route 134 (Bergen County, New Jersey)
  New Mexico State Road 134
  New York State Route 134
 County Route 134A (Cortland County, New York)
 County Route 134B (Cortland County, New York)
  County Route 134 (Montgomery County, New York)
  County Route 134 (Onondaga County, New York)
  County Route 134 (Sullivan County, New York)
  County Route 134 (Wayne County, New York)
  North Carolina Highway 134
  Ohio State Route 134
  Oklahoma State Highway 134 (former)
  Pennsylvania Route 134
  South Dakota Highway 134
  Tennessee State Route 134
  Texas State Highway 134 (former)
  Texas State Highway Spur 134
  Farm to Market Road 134
  Utah State Route 134
  Utah State Route 134 (1933-1969) (former)
  Virginia State Route 134
  Virginia State Route 134 (1930-1933) (former)
  Virginia State Route 134 (1933-1942) (former)
  Wisconsin Highway 134
  Wyoming Highway 134

Territories
  Puerto Rico Highway 134